Dialakoro, Guinea may refer to:
 Dialakoro, Faranah - town and sub-prefecture in Dinguiraye Prefecture, Faranah Region, Guinea
 Dialakoro, Kankan - town and sub-prefecture in Mandiana Prefecture, Kankan Region, Guinea